Udea ferrugalis, the rusty dot pearl, is a moth of the family Crambidae. The species was first described by Jacob Hübner in 1796.

Distribution
This species can be found in central and southern Europe, Asia Minor, Africa, India and Japan.

Description
The wingspan is 18–22 mm. The forewings of these small moths have yellow, brown or ferruginous ground colour and prominent indistinct dark brown or blackish markings towards the edge. Hindwings are brownish grey. Legs are whitish. They are greenish with yellowish head.

Biology
These moths are bivoltine or trivoltine. The moth flies through the year, but mainly in the autumn, depending on location. The larvae feed on various herbaceous plants, such as Stachys, Arctium, Lycopus, Mentha, Eupatorium cannabinum and Fragaria vesca. They overwinter in the soil as a chrysalis. This species is sometimes considered a pest, as the larvae attack various crop plants.

References

External links
 Lepidoptera of Belgium
 BioLib
 African Moths
 Lepiforum e. V.

ferrugalis
Moths of Africa
Moths of the Comoros
Moths of Europe
Moths of Iceland
Moths of Madagascar
Moths of Mauritius
Moths of Réunion
Moths of Seychelles
Moths of Asia
Moths described in 1796
Taxa named by Jacob Hübner